Nankar is a village in West Champaran district in the Indian state of Bihar.

Demographics
As of 2011 India census, Nankar had a population of 1339 in 277 households. Males constitute 52.5% of the population and females 47.4%. Nankar has an average literacy rate of 32.3%, lower than the national average of 74%: male literacy is 68.1%, and female literacy is 31.8%. In Nankar, 23.9% of the population is under 6 years of age.

References

Villages in West Champaran district